The Roman Catholic Archdiocese of Ende is a Latin metropolitan archdiocese in the Lesser Sunda Islands, Indonesia.

Its cathedral is the Christ the King Cathedral in the city of Ende, Nusa Tenggara Timur.

History
The archdiocese was established on 16 September 1913 as Apostolic Prefecture of Lesser Sunda Islands, on territory split from what was then Apostolic Vicariate of Batavia (now Archdiocese of Jakarta, then covering the Dutch East Indies).

On 12 March 1922 the Prefecture was promoted to Apostolic Vicariate of Lesser Sunda Islands (curiate Italian: Isole della Piccola Sonda), hence entitled to a titular bishop. On 25 February 1936 the Vicariate was split to establish the Apostolic Vicariate of Dutch Timor. On 10 July 1950 the Vicariate was split to establish the Apostolic Prefecture of Denpasar. On 8 March 1951 it was name Apostolic Vicariate of Endeh, after its see, having lost territories to establish the Apostolic Vicariate of Larantuka and the Apostolic Vicariate of Ruteng. On 20 October 1959 another split established the Apostolic Prefecture of Weetebula. On 3 January 1961 it became Metropolitan Archdiocese of Endeh. On 14 May 1974 it was renamed Metropolitan Archdiocese of Ende. On 14 December 2005 the Archdiocese was again split to establish the diocese of Maumere.

Ordinaries
(all Roman Rite; missionary members of a Latin congregation till 1996)

Apostolic Prefect of Lesser Sunda Islands (Isole della Piccola Sonda) 

Fr. Pietro Noyen, Divine Word Missionaries (S.V.D.) (1913 – death 1921)

Apostolic Vicars of Lesser Sunda Islands 

Arnoldo Verstraelen, S.V.D. (14 March 1922 – death 15 March 1932), Titular Bishop of Myriophytos (13 March 1922 – 15 March 1932)
Enrico Leven, S.V.D. (25 April 1933 – 1950), Titular Bishop of Arca in Armenia (25 April 1933 – death 31 January 1953)

Apostolic Vicar of Endeh 

Antoine Hubert Thijssen, S.V.D. (8 March 1951 – 3 January 1961), Titular Bishop of Nilopolis (8 March 1951 – 3 January 1961); later Bishop of Larantuka (Indonesia) (3 January 1961 – 23 February 1973), Apostolic Administrator of Denpasar (Indonesia) (1973 – 4 September 1980), Titular Bishop of Eguga (23 February 1973 – 7 June 1982)

Metropolitan Archbishops of Endeh 

Gabriel Manek, S.V.D. (3 January 1961 – 19 December 1968), previously Titular Bishop of Alinda (8 March 1951 – 3 January 1961) & Apostolic Vicar of Larantuka (Indonesia) (8 March 1951 – 3 January 1961); emeritate as Titular Archbishop of Bavagaliana (19 December 1968 – 15 May 1976)

Metropolitan Archbishops of Ende 

Donatus Djagom, S.V.D. (19 December 1968 – 23 February 1996)
Longinus Da Cunha (23 February 1996 – 6 April 2006)
Vincentius Sensi Potokota (14 April 2007 – ...), previously Bishop of daughter diocese Maumere (Indonesia) (14 December 2005 – 14 April 2007)

Province
Its ecclesiastical province comprises the metropolitan's own Archdiocese and these Suffragan bishoprics:
Roman Catholic Diocese of Denpasar
Roman Catholic Diocese of Larantuka
Roman Catholic Diocese of Maumere
Roman Catholic Diocese of Ruteng

Source and External links
GCatholic.org, with incumbent biography links
Catholic Hierarchy

1913 establishments in the Dutch East Indies
Christian organizations established in 1913
Roman Catholic dioceses and prelatures established in the 20th century
Roman Catholic dioceses in Indonesia